Odette Juliette Annable (born May 10, 1985) is an American actress. She is known for various roles in film and television, including as Dr. Jessica Adams in the Fox medical drama series House, Beth McIntyre in the monster film Cloverfield, Aubrey Diaz in the ABC drama series October Road, Samantha Arias / Reign in Supergirl, and Nola Longshadow in Banshee.

Early life
Odette Juliette Yustman was born on May 10, 1985, in Los Angeles County, California, to a Colombian father and a Cuban mother. Her father is of French, Italian, and Swiss descent. She grew up near Palm Springs. Her first language is Spanish and she didn't learn to speak English until she was five. She graduated from Woodcrest Christian High School in Riverside.

Career
Annable played a Spanish-speaking student in Kindergarten Cop at age 5. She later starred in the TV series South Beach and October Road. She had a lead role in the 2007 Lifetime film Reckless Behavior: Caught on Tape, and Cloverfield, as well as an appearance in the comedy film Walk Hard, and the 2009 film The Unborn.

In 2011, she played nurse Annie Miller in season five of Brothers & Sisters. Annable played Melanie Garcia on the comedy Breaking In as a series regular in its first season, appearing as a guest star thereafter. She joined the TV series House as Dr. Jessica Adams, and remained on the show until the finale in May 2012.

In March 2014, Annable was cast as Trudy Cooper in the ABC series The Astronaut Wives Club.

In 2017, she joined the main cast of the CW series Supergirl as Samantha Arias, a single mother who discovers that she shares origins with Supergirl and Superman, as well as Reign, the Kryptonian Worldkiller she was engineered to be. From 2021, she joined Walker as Geraldine Broussard, a friend of the Walker's and local barkeep.

Personal life
She was engaged to actor Trevor Wright until their breakup in 2008. She married her Brothers & Sisters co-star Dave Annable in October 2010. They have two daughters. In October 2019, the couple announced their separation, but announced their reconciliation in August 2020.

Annable endorsed Hillary Clinton in the 2016 United States presidential election.

Filmography

Film

Television

Music videos

Video game

References

External links

 

1985 births
20th-century American actresses
21st-century American actresses
Actresses from Los Angeles
American child actresses
American film actresses
American people of Colombian descent
American people of Cuban descent
American television actresses
American voice actresses
California people in fashion
Female models from California
Hispanic and Latino American actresses
Living people
Models from Los Angeles
Colombian American
Cuban American